Sir John Mackintosh MacLeod, 1st Baronet  (5 May 1857 – 6 March 1934) was a Scottish MP for the Unionist Party.  He sat for Glasgow Central from a by-election in 1915 to 1918, and for Glasgow Kelvingrove from 1918 to 1922.  He was elected in 1918 as a supporter of David Lloyd George's coalition government.

He was the second son of Rev. Norman MacLeod. He had an younger brother, the Scottish international rugby union footballer William MacKintosh MacLeod, and six sisters.

McLeod was created a baronet in the 1924 Prime Minister's Resignation Honours.

He married Edith Fielden in 1888. They had two sons, the second baronet (and father of the third baronet), and George MacLeod, the fourth baronet, founder of the Iona Community, Moderator of the General Assembly of the Church of Scotland and Minister at Govan Old Parish Church. They also had a daughter, Ellen, who married Rev. James Alan Cameron Murray.

References

External links 
 

1857 births
1934 deaths
Members of the Parliament of the United Kingdom for Glasgow constituencies
UK MPs 1910–1918
UK MPs 1918–1922
Unionist Party (Scotland) MPs
Baronets in the Baronetage of the United Kingdom